Mike Mangione is an American singer-songwriter, guitarist, and percussionist. He currently leads the band Mike Mangione & The Kin, an orchestral folk group, with his brother, Tom Mangione. Tom plays electric guitar. The band calls both Chicago and Milwaukee their home since members split the cities. American Songwriter magazine gave four stars for his release, Red-Winged Blackbird Man.

He has released five LP records and one EP. In 2017 Mike released the "Three Days EP" which featured a cover of Peter Gabriel's "Don't Give Up" as a duet with fellow Wisconsin native Peter Mulvey.  Mike's Fifth studio record "But I've Seen The Stars" was recorded at Ocean Way Recording with producer Matt Linesch (Edward Sharpe and the Magnetic Zeros, Dave Mason) and premiered in Relix Magazine. The album was released October 20, 2017 on Mike's own label "RODZINKArecords" and was named one of the best records of 2017 by Milwaukee Journal Sentinel.

Mike Mangione had a non-speaking role as "Mail Boy" in the 2004 movie Anchorman: The Legend of Ron Burgundy. The money made from his work on the movie financed his first tour. Mike also does voiceover work.  In 2016 and 2017 Mike lent his voice for multiple Milwaukee Brewers commercials, one of which won the Emmy Award.

He is also the host of the podcast Time & The Mystery: Conversations with Mike Mangione, in which he sits with public figures to discuss their inspiration, process, and connection with others through their work.

Education
Mike Mangione graduated from Glenbrook South High School in Glenview, IL where he played drums and sang in multiple bands.  One band was fronted by classmate turned actor Sam Witwer.  He went on to study Urban and Environmental Affairs and graduate from Marquette University

Personal life
Mangione grew up in Glenview, Illinois, a northern suburb of Chicago. Currently lives in Wisconsin with his wife and three children.  He is Catholic.

References

Year of birth missing (living people)
Living people
American folk musicians
American Roman Catholics